Kumbanad is a town located in the Koipuram Town Panchayath Along with Pullad. It is part of Thiruvalla Taluk of Pathanamthitta district in the State of Kerala.
It is an important town situated on T.K. Road, equidistant  from Eraviperoor and Pullad; which are at a distance of 3 kms.It Comes Under Thiruvalla Sub-District & At A Distance Of 10 km From NH 183 In Thiruvalla City

Economy 
Remittance from NRIs is the primary source of income. The large number of ATMs and high density of banks are also attributed to large bank deposits. As of 2009, the bank deposits for the Kumbanad-Thiruvalla belt are estimated to be  5,400 Crore.

There are other small business and services that depend on the foreign remittance. Since most of the emigrants are young and middle aged, most of the settled population is old-aged. There are services and health care units that cater to their needs.

Politics 
Kumbanad is part of the Pathanamthitta District. In Lok Sabha, Kumbanad is represented by the sitting MP from Pathanamthitta, Mr. Anto Antony (Indian National Congress).  Aranmula assembly segment and Veena George is the current MLA (2016  Kerala Legislative Assembly elections).  Asha CG (United Democratic Front) is the current Koipuram Panchayat President.

See also 
 Kozhencherry
 Pullad
 Tiruvalla
 Koipuram
 Indian Pentecostal Church of God

References

External links 

 Aerial view of Kumbanad
 Constituencies
 Census Koipuram
 Census India

Villages in Pathanamthitta district